Tshomlee Cabanos Go (born January 13, 1981 in Iriga, Camarines Sur) is a taekwondo practitioner from the Philippines. He represented the country in the 2004 and 2008 Summer Olympics.

Go and his family left the Philippines sometime in the early 2010s to migrate to California in the United States. As of 2020, he works as a captain for a ship of the San Francisco Bay Ferry service and as an instructor in a gymnasium in Vallejo.

See also
 Philippines at the 2008 Summer Olympics

References

External links
 

1981 births
Living people
People from Iriga
Sportspeople from Camarines Sur
Filipino male taekwondo practitioners
Olympic taekwondo practitioners of the Philippines
Taekwondo practitioners at the 2004 Summer Olympics
Taekwondo practitioners at the 2008 Summer Olympics
Asian Games medalists in taekwondo
Taekwondo practitioners at the 2002 Asian Games
Taekwondo practitioners at the 2006 Asian Games
Taekwondo practitioners at the 2010 Asian Games
Asian Games silver medalists for the Philippines
Asian Games bronze medalists for the Philippines
Medalists at the 2002 Asian Games
Medalists at the 2006 Asian Games
Medalists at the 2010 Asian Games
Southeast Asian Games gold medalists for the Philippines
Southeast Asian Games competitors for the Philippines
Southeast Asian Games medalists in taekwondo
Competitors at the 2005 Southeast Asian Games
Asian Taekwondo Championships medalists
Filipino expatriate sportspeople in the United States
21st-century Filipino people